The Best of Motörhead is a compilation album by the band Motörhead, released in July 1993. It includes 20 of their most popular songs.

Track listing

The Muggers Tapes
"White Lightening"
"Space Chaser"
"Something Else" (Eddie Cochran, Sharon Sheeley)
"Would If You Could"
"(Just a) Nightmare"
"Cinnamon Girl" (Neil Young)
"Summertime Blues" (Eddie Cochran, Jerry Capehart)
"Killer Killer"

References

Motörhead compilation albums
1993 greatest hits albums
Roadrunner Records compilation albums